Anna Marie Höljer-Serra (born 22 October 1965) is a road cyclist from Sweden. She represented her nation at the 1988 Summer Olympics in the women's road race and at the 1992 Summer Olympics in the women's road race.

References

External links
 profile at sports-reference.com

Swedish female cyclists
Cyclists at the 1992 Summer Olympics
Cyclists at the 1988 Summer Olympics
Olympic cyclists of Sweden
Living people
Sportspeople from Västmanland County
1965 births